Brink or variant, may refer to:

Places
 Brink, Virginia, United States
 Brink, West Virginia, an unincorporated community, United States
 Brink, Greenbrier County, West Virginia, a ghost town, United States
 Brink (norra delen), a location in Botkyrka Municipality in Sweden
 Brink tram stop in Amstelveen, Netherlands
 Brink Junior High School, South Oklahoma City, United States
 PAM Brink Stadium, Springs, South Africa

Groups and organizations
 Brink's,  security and protection company
 Brink Productions, a theatre company based in South Australia, Australia

Arts and entertainment
 Brink!, 1998 Disney Channel film
 Brink (TV series), a scientific television series that airs on the Science Channel
 Brink (video game), a video game developed by Splash Damage

Other uses
 Brink (surname)

See also

 Brinkmanship or brinksmanship
 
 The Brink (disambiguation)
 On the Brink (disambiguation)